The Collie River is a river in the South West region of Western Australia.

The Collie River was named by Lieutenant Governor Stirling after Alexander Collie who, along with Lieutenant William Preston, in November 1829 was the first European to explore the river.

For Western Australia's growing population the reservoir is considered a valuable resource, but the water is too salty for drinking.
The Waters and Rivers Commission has a target of reducing the salinity of the river water to 500 mg/L by 2015 as a part of the State Salinity Strategy.

Tributaries 
There are many tributaries of the Collie River including Collie River East, Collie River South, Bingham River, Brunswick River, Gervase River, Hamilton River, Harris River, Ironstone Gully, Silver Wattle Gully, Worsley River, Riches Gully and Mill Brook.

References

External links
Collie River visitors' information

Rivers of the South West region
Collie, Western Australia